Simon and the Witch is a children's book by Margaret Stuart Barry, published by Collins, illustrated by Linda Birch. It also refers to the name of the series, which follows on. Simon is a very sensible young schoolboy, who has a friend who is a real witch. She is very silly, and a huge showoff.

Following a one off dramatisation of the first story in 1985 as part of the Children's BBC series Up Our Street, in 1987 the concept was adapted into a television series, starring Elizabeth Spriggs as the Witch, and Hugh Pollard as Simon, which ran for two series.

Plot
In the first chapter, The Backwards Spell the witch teaches Simon how to turn the school gardener into a frog, but forgets how to turn him back. She eventually remembers the spell, and turns the gardener into a man again, claiming privately she never forgot the spell at all.

In chapter two, The Lost Magic Wand, the witch loses her wand so Simon takes her to the police station where the witch becomes fascinated with Constable Scruff's uniform, and so becomes a policewoman. The three eventually find the witch's wand, which has been stolen by two thieves who used it as a poker for their fire.

In chapter three, The Witch at the Seaside, Simon takes the witch on holiday to the beach for a day, where she makes the English Channel disappear, not believing Simon's assurances that it is not flooding. She agrees to put it back on the condition she is featured on the evening news, which she is. In The Witch has Measles, chapter four, the witch catches double German measles, so goes to hospital.

She sees the trolleys patients are moved round on, and organises races on them, and everyone has so much fun they all feel better and go home again.

In chapter five, Halloween, the witch (who has never heard of Halloween before) goes to a Halloween party, but is disgusted by 'fake' witches. Fortunately, one hundred of her relatives turn up, with their black cats, and they crash the party, demonstrating their magic many times over. The final chapter of the book, The Witch's Visitor, is set at Christmas, the witch makes a snowman come to life, introducing him to people as her Uncle Fred.

Other books in the series
Other books in the Simon and the Witch series are:
 Simon and the Witch in School
 The Return of the Witch
 The Witch and the Holiday Club
 The Millionaire Witch
 The Witch of Monopoly Manor
 The Witch on Holiday
 The Witch V.I.P.

Television series

In 1985, the first of the stories (The Backwards Spell) was dramatised for Children's BBC, and shown as a one-off episode (called "Simon and the Witch") in the second series of Up Our Street, a series of unrelated wacky stories, each with a different cast and writer, linked only by the unnamed 'street' of the title. Desmond Askew and Joanna Monro played the respective title characters.

With the episode being well received, the BBC felt that the concept had potential to be developed as an ongoing Children's BBC series. In 1987, the books were made into a television series for Children's BBC, consisting of twenty five fifteen minute episodes, starring Elizabeth Spriggs as the Witch, and Hugh Pollard as Simon. Guest stars included Joan Sims, Nicola Stapleton, and Naomie Harris.

First shown on 16 November 1987, the programme ran for two series and proved popular with viewers, pulling in decent ratings for its Children's BBC slot, and with both first and second series later being repeated after their initial airings.

Whilst the end of the second series wrapped up a number of the ongoing storylines, it left the door open for a potential third series. However, due both to the age of star Hugh Pollard and several child co stars, as well as Children's BBC reassessing their demographic output in 1990, the second series turned out to be the last.

References

External links 
 

1976 British novels
Children's fantasy novels
British fantasy novels
British children's novels
Series of children's books
1985 British television episodes
1987 British television series debuts
1988 British television series endings
1980s British children's television series
BBC children's television shows
British television shows based on children's books
British children's fantasy television series
English-language television shows
William Collins, Sons books
1976 children's books
Fictional duos
Literary characters introduced in 1976
Television characters introduced in 1985
Witchcraft in television
Witchcraft in written fiction